Achille Liénart (7 February 1884—15 February 1973) was a French cardinal of the Roman Catholic Church. He served as Bishop of Lille from 1928 to 1968, and was elevated to the cardinalate in 1930.

Biography
Born in Lille to a bourgeois family of cloth merchants, Liénart was the second of the four children of Achille Philippe Hyacinthe Liénart and Louise Delesalle. He studied at College Saint-Joseph, the Seminary of Saint-Sulpice in Paris, the Institut Catholique de Paris, Collège de Sorbonne, and the Pontifical Biblical Institute in Rome. He was ordained to the priesthood on 29 June 1907, and then taught at the Seminary of Cambrai until 1910, and then at Lille until 1914. During World War I Liénart served as a chaplain to the French Army, and did pastoral work in his hometown from 1919 to 1928. As a priest, he championed social reform, trade unionism, and the worker-priest movement.

On 6 October 1928 he was appointed Bishop of Lille by Pope Pius XI. Liénart received his episcopal consecration on the following December 8 from Bishop Charles-Albert-Joseph Lecomte of Amiens, with Bishops Palmyre Jasoone and Maurice Feltin serving as co-consecrators, in Tourcoing. He was created Cardinal Priest of S. Sisto by Pius XI in the consistory of 30 June 1930.  By coincidence, one of the first priests he ordained, on 21 September 1929, was Marcel Lefebvre.  Liénart's and Lefebvre's paths were intertwined during the following years, even serving both on the Central Preparatory Commission for the Second Vatican Council. And it was Liénart who, as cardinal, in 1947 consecrated Lefebvre (who had been appointed as Apostolic Vicar of Dakar in Senegal), to the episcopate.

During the German occupation, Liénart initially supported Philippe Pétain, but was greatly opposed to Nazi Germany.

Liénart, who participated in the 1939 papal conclave, was elected president of the French Episcopal Conference in 1948, representing the Catholic Church in France, and remained in that post until 1964. An elector in the 1958 papal conclave, he was named the first territorial prelate of Mission de France on 13 November 1954 and later resigned from this post in 1964.

An active participant of the Second Vatican Council (1962–1965), Liénart was a leading liberal voice at the council and sat on its Board of Presidency. When the Roman Curia, composed predominantly of conservative prelates, issued a list of nominees for the members of the council's commissions, Liénart objected that nothing of the nominees' qualifications were included. Liénart, assisted by Cardinals Bernardus Johannes Alfrink and Giovanni Colombo, delivered one of the closing messages of the council on 8 December 1965. He was also one of the cardinal electors in the 1963 papal conclave, which selected Pope Paul VI.

Liénart resigned as Lille's bishop on 14 March 1968, after forty years of service. He lost, on January 1, 1971, the right to participate in a conclave, having reached the age of 80. After his death at 89, he was buried in the Cathédrale Notre-Dame-de-la-Treille.

References

External links
Catholic-Hierarchy Profile 
Cardinals of the Holy Roman Church Profile

1884 births
1973 deaths
Catholic Church in France
Bishops of Lille
20th-century French cardinals
Participants in the Second Vatican Council
Territorial prelates
French military personnel of World War I
Grand Officiers of the Légion d'honneur
French military chaplains
World War I chaplains
French Army chaplains
Pontifical Biblical Institute alumni
University of Paris alumni